Rushk is a Pakistani rock band from Karachi, Sindh, Pakistan, formed in 2000. They gained fame through their single "Behti Naar", and its music video which was directed by Saqib Malik.

History

2000–2009
Rushk was formed in 2000 with Nazia Zuberi on vocals, Uns Mufti on guitars and songwriter Ziyaad Gulzar on guitars and keys. They released their debut single "Behti Naar" in the 2000s. The music video was directed by Saqib Malik. "Behti Naar" was nominated in the Best Alternative Song at the 2004 Indus Music Awards

The band released their debut album Sawal in 2006 consisting of 14 tracks under the record label Sound Master which received positive reviews.

"Behti Naar" was also used as the title song for the Hum TV television series, Malaal.

2012 Bollywood debut
Although the band had been in hiatus since 2009, they released a revamped version of "Adhoora Hoon" from their debut album Sawaal under the title "Darta Hoon (Adhoora Hoon)" for the soundtrack of the Bollywood film, Jism 2.

2013–present
Rushk returned in 2013 with Uns Mufti and Ziyaad Gulzar reprising their roles and being joined by Tara Mahmood, Sikandar Mufti and Ali Jafri and released their first single accompanied by a music video after their comeback titled "Mera Naam". They released two other singles "Tujhay Patta To Chalay" and "Aye Na".

The band participated in the 2013 Global Battle of the Bands and were finalists.

In 2014, Rushk also released the single "Bori" for the delayed 2014 Pakistani film Downward Dog and has worked on the musical score of the film.

The band has also been performing at different venues around the world since then.

Discography

Albums

Sawal

Sawal was released in 2006. The album has received positive reviews. The song "Behti Naar" was used as the title song for the 2009 Hum TV television series, Malaal. The song "Adhoora Hoon" was used in the 2012 Bollywood film, Jism 2.

Track Listing

Personnel 
 Nazia Zuberi - lead vocals (2014 – present)
 Ziyaad Gulzar - guitars and keys(2000-2009) 
 Uns Mufti - guitars and songwriter 

Singles
 "Behti Naar"
 "Khuahish"
 "Adhoora Hoon"

Music videos
 "Behti Naar"
 "Khuahish"

Soundtracks

Pakistani television series
 "Behti Naar" for the 2009 Hum TV television series Malaal, and also part of their debut album Sawal. The song was originally released in 2001.

Bollywood
 "Darta Hoon (Adhoora Hoon)" for the 2012 Bollywood film Jism 2, and also part of their debut album Sawal. The song was originally released in 2006 under the title "Adhoora Hoon", which was also the name used in their debut album.

Pakistani films
 Bori for the delayed 2014 Pakistani film Downward Dog.

Singles
 "Tujhay Patta To Chalay" (2014)
 "Mera Naam" (2014)
 "Aye Na" (2016)

Music videos
 "Behti Naar" (2001)
 "Khuahish" (2004)
 "Mera Naam" (2014)

Band members
Current
 Tara Mahmood - lead vocals (2014 – present)
 Ziyaad Gulzar - guitars and keys(2000-2009) (2014 – present)
 Uns Mufti - guitars and songwriter (2000-2009) (2014 – present)
 Ali Jafri - bass (2014 – present)
 Sikandar Mufti - drums (2014 – present)

Former
 Nazia Zuberi - lead vocals (2000-2009)

Timeline

Awards and nominations
 "Behti Naar" was nominated for the 2004 Indus Music Awards in the Best Alternative Song category.

See also
 List of Pakistani music bands
 Tara Mahmood
 The Milestones

References

 Musical groups established in 2000
 Pakistani musical groups
 Pakistani rock music groups
 Musical groups from Karachi